Gosain Gaon is a village in Bhagalpur, Bihar, India.

References

Villages in Bhagalpur district